Musteloidea is a superfamily of carnivoran mammals united by shared characteristics of the skull and teeth. Musteloids are the sister group of pinnipeds, the group which includes seals.

The Musteloidea consists of the families Ailuridae (red pandas), Mustelidae (mustelids: weasels, otters, 
martens and badgers), Procyonidae (procyonids: raccoons, coatis, kinkajous, olingos, olinguitos, ringtails and cacomistles), and Mephitidae (skunks and stink badgers).

In North America, ursoids and musteloids first appear in the Chadronian (late Eocene).  In Europe, ursoids and musteloids first appear in the early Oligocene immediately following the Grande Coupure.

The cladogram is based on molecular phylogeny of six genes in Flynn (2005), with the musteloids updated following the multigene analysis of Law et al. (2018).

References

 
Mammal superfamilies